Henry County R-I School District is a school district headquartered in Windsor, Missouri.

Schools
 Windsor Jr.-Sr. High School
 Windsor Elementary School

References

External links
 

Education in Henry County, Missouri
School districts in Missouri